Victor Olson may refer to:

Victor Olson, character in Bitten (TV series)
Victor Olson (politician), colleague of Gary Doer
Victor Olson (1924-2007), illustrator

See also

Vic Olsson